Gérard Pettipas, C.Ss.R. (born September 6, 1950) is a Canadian prelate of the Roman Catholic Church. He is a member of the Congregation of the Most Holy Redeemer (Redemptorists). He currently serves as archbishop of the Archdiocese of Grouard-McLennan.

Biography
Pettipas was born in Halifax, Nova Scotia. At the age of 26, he was ordained a priest on May 7, 1977, by Bishop Thomas Benjamin Fulton, who at the time was the Titular Bishop of Cursola.

At the age of 56, he was appointed as archbishop of Grouard-McLennan by Pope Benedict XVI on November 30, 2006. He received his episcopal consecration on January 25, 2007, by Archbishop Luigi Ventura, who at the time was the Apostolic Nuncio to Canada; Bishop Denis Croteau, O.M.I., Bishop Emeritus of the Diocese of MacKenzie-Fort Smith, North West Territories, Canada; and Bishop Gary Michael Jordan, who at that time was Bishop of the Diocese of Whitehorse, Yukon, Canada.

Pettipas was the primary consecrator of Bishop Mark Andrew Hagemoen and Bishop Jon Hansen, C.Ss.R., both Bishops of the Diocese of MacKenzie-Fort Smith, North West Territories, Canada. And Pettipas was the co-consecrator of Bishop Héctor Felipe Vila, Bishop of the Diocese of Whitehorse, Yukon, Canada.

References

1950 births
Living people
People from Halifax, Nova Scotia
Redemptorist bishops
21st-century Roman Catholic archbishops in Canada
Roman Catholic archbishops of Grouard–McLennan